George Charles Montagu, 9th Earl of Sandwich (29 December 1874 – 15 June 1962), known as George Montagu until 1916, was a British Conservative politician.

Sandwich was the son of Rear-Admiral the Hon. Victor Alexander Montagu, second son of John Montagu, 7th Earl of Sandwich. His mother was Lady Agneta Harriet, daughter of Charles Yorke, 4th Earl of Hardwicke. He was Assistant Private Secretary to the Board of Trade from 1898 to 1900. The latter year he was returned to Parliament for Huntingdon, a seat he held until 1906. In 1916 Sandwich succeeded his uncle in the earldom and entered the House of Lords. He later served as Lord-Lieutenant of Huntingdonshire between 1922 and 1946.

Marriage and family
Lord Sandwich married Alberta Sturges, daughter of William Sturges of New York City, at St Paul's Church, Knightsbridge, in 1905. The couple had four children:
 Alexander Victor Edward Paulet Montagu (22 May 1906 – 25 February 1995); succeeded as the 10th Earl of Sandwich before disclaiming the title two years later. He was succeeded in the title by his son John.
 Hon. William Drogo Sturges Montagu (29 May 1908 – 26 January 1940); married the Hon. Janet Gladys Aitken (1908–1988), former wife of Ian Campbell (later 11th Duke of Argyll). He died during World War II.
 Lady Mary Faith Montagu (1 November 1911 – 16 February 1983)
 Lady Elizabeth Montagu (4 July 1917 – 10 January 2006)

He died in June 1962, aged 87, and was succeeded in the earldom by his eldest son, Victor, who was also a Conservative politician.

Notes

References
 Kidd, Charles, Williamson, David (editors). Debrett's Peerage and Baronetage (1990 edition). New York: St Martin's Press, 1990,

External links 
 

1874 births
1962 deaths
George Montagu, 09th Earl of Sandwich
Lord-Lieutenants of Huntingdonshire
Conservative Party (UK) MPs for English constituencies
UK MPs 1900–1906
Sandwich, E9
Earls of Sandwich